Anthony Surath Jayawardena is a British actor, known for his roles as Mr Bhamra in the West End musical Bend It Like Beckham the Musical and for his work with the Royal Shakespeare Company, Shakespeare's Globe and Royal National Theatre. In 2018, he began portraying the role of Rashid Hyatt in the Channel 4 drama Ackley Bridge.

Career
Jayawardena appears on the original cast recording of Bend It Like Beckham the Musical, performing the songs "People Like Us" and "The Engagement: Look At Us Now". He was the original Abdul Kareem in the play The Empress by Tanika Gupta, which tells the story of Queen Victoria's relationship with The Munshi, a young man brought over from India to be her servant in the final 15 years of her life. He played Stephano in the RSC's production of The Tempest, which partnered with Intel and Imaginarium Studios and was the first use of real-time motion-capture technology on stage.

Filmography

Stage

Discography

References

External links

Living people
21st-century British male actors
Year of birth missing (living people)
British male film actors
British male television actors
British male stage actors
Male actors from London
Sinhalese male actors
British people of Sri Lankan descent